Pau Víctor Delgado (born 26 November 2001) is a Spanish professional footballer who plays for CE Sabadell FC, on loan from Girona FC. Mainly an attacking midfielder, he can also play as a forward.

Club career
Born in Sant Cugat del Vallès, Barcelona, Catalonia, Víctor joined Girona FC's youth setup in 2018, from CE Sabadell FC. On 20 July 2020, before even having appeared for the reserves, he made his professional debut coming on as a second-half substitute for Jairo Izquierdo in a 0–2 Segunda División away loss against AD Alcorcón.

On 29 August 2022, Víctor and teammate Álex Sala were loaned out to Primera Federación side CE Sabadell FC for one year.

References

External links
 
 
 

2001 births
Living people
People from Sant Cugat del Vallès
Sportspeople from the Province of Barcelona
Spanish footballers
Footballers from Catalonia
Association football midfielders
Segunda División players
Tercera División players
Tercera Federación players
Girona FC players
Girona FC B players
CE Sabadell FC footballers